The Onomastics of the Gothic language (Gothic personal names) are an important source not only for the history of the Goths themselves, but for Germanic onomastics in general and the linguistic and cultural history of the Germanic Heroic Age of c. the 3rd to 6th centuries.
Gothic names can be found in Roman records as far back as the 4th century AD. 
After the Muslim invasion of Hispania and the fall of the Visigothic kingdom in the early 8th century, the Gothic tradition was largely interrupted, although Gothic or pseudo-Gothic names continued to be given in the Kingdom of Asturias in the 9th and 10th centuries.

History
The names of the Goths themselves have been traced to their 3rd century settlement in Scythia. 
The names Tervingi and Greuthungi have been interpreted as meaning "forest-dwellers" and "steppe-dwellers", respectively. Later on, the terms Ostrogothi and Visigothi have also been understood to mean "Eastern Goths" and "Western Goths", although all four etymologies are not without detractors.

Jordanes gives partly mythological genealogies leading up to historical 4th to 5th century rulers:
Amali dynasty:  Gapt, Hulmu,  Augis, Amal,  Athal, Achiulf, Oduulf, Ansila, Ediulf, Vultuulf, Ermanaric
Vultuulf, Valaravans, Vinithariust Vandalarius, Theodemir, Valamir,  Vidimer.

Another important source of early Gothic names are the accounts (hagiography) surrounding the persecution of Gothic Christians in the second half of the 4th century. Many of the Gothic saints mentioned in these sources bear resemblance to Syrian, Cappadocian and Phrygian names, following in the baptismal tradition of that time.

Even though the Muslim invasion of Hispania (715 AD) and subsequent fall of the Visigothic kingdom in the early 8th century caused most Gothic naming traditions to be lost, a type of Gothic or pseudo-Gothic naming tradition continued in the Kingdom of Asturias, which by that time had become the central driving force behind the Christian reconquest of Andalusia.
Thus, Alfonso I of Asturias was originally given the Gothic name *Adafuns or Adalfuns, becoming one of the most popular names in the medieval Iberian kingdoms.

In France, where remnants of the old Visigothic Kingdom still remained (Gothic March),Gothic names continued to be common up until the 12th century.

List of names
Gothic names of the 4th to 6th centuries include:

See also
Name of the Goths
List of Visigothic queens
Amali dynasty
Balthi dynasty

References

Herwig Wolfram, Die Goten: von den Anfängen bis zur Mitte des sechsten Jahrhunderts : Entwurf einer historischen Ethnographie, part I. "Die Namen", pp. 30–46.
Richard Loewe, "Gotische Namen in hagiographischen Texten", BGDSL 47 (1923), 407–433.
Moritz Schönfeld,  Wörterbuch der altgermanischen personen- und völkernamen (1911).

External links
Gothic names (infernaldreams.com) 
Gothic and Suevic Names in Galicia (NW Spain) before 1200 (celtiberia.net)

Gothic
Names